The Seafarer 36C is an American sailboat that was designed by Philip Rhodes as a cruiser and first built in 1968. The boat was built with a ketch rig or an optional sloop rig, without the mizzen mast, but with a taller main mast. The design was based on Rhodes Design #702.

Production
The design was built by Seafarer Yachts in the United States, starting in 1968, but it is now out of production.

Design
The Seafarer 36C is a recreational keelboat, built predominantly of fiberglass, with wood trim. It has a ketch or optional masthead sloop rig; a spooned, raked stem; a raised counter, angled transom; a keel-mounted rudder controlled by a wheel and a fixed, modified long keel, with a cutaway forefoot. It displaces  and carries  of ballast.

The boat is fitted with a Universal  diesel engine for docking and maneuvering.

The design has two accommodations plans. Plan "A" has sleeping space for six people, with a double "V"-berth in the bow cabin, a starboard dinette table that converts to a double berth and an aft cabin in the deckhouse with a single berth on each side. The galley is located on the port side of the main cabin. The galley is located in the main cabin, is "U"-shaped and is equipped with a three-burner stove, ice box and a sink. The head is located just aft of the bow cabin on the port side and includes a shower.

Plan "B" also has sleeping accommodation for six people, with a double "V"-berth in the bow cabin, a starboard  dinette table that converts to a double berth in the main cabin, along with a main cabin single berth on the port side and an aft cabin in the deckhouse with a single berth also on the port side. The galley is located in the deckhouse, just forward of the companionway ladder. The galley is straight and is equipped with a three-burner stove, an icebox and a sink. The head is located just aft of the bow cabin on the port side and includes a shower.

See also
List of sailing boat types

References

External links
Photo of a Seafarer 36C with bowsprit and cutter rig

Keelboats
1960s sailboat type designs
Sailing yachts 
Sailboat type designs by Philip Rhodes
Sailboat types built by Seafarer Yachts